Beautiful Country: A Memoir of an Undocumented Childhood is a 2021 memoir by Chinese American lawyer Qian Julie Wang. It was published on September 7, 2021 by Doubleday, an imprint of Penguin Random House. In The New York Times, reviewer Elisabeth Egan described the book as a "powerful story" that "reminds us how lucky we are to have the privileges unlocked by this little blue booklet [United States passport] — and what others risk and endure every day in hopes of getting one too." The book's title derives from the literal translation of the Chinese word for the United States, which means "beautiful country".

Synopsis
In Beautiful Country, Wang writes about the hardships that she and her parents faced upon their arrival to the United States in 1994, as undocumented immigrants from China. She discusses the numerous challenges she faced of growing up in poverty, and how she emerged from all of it with her dreams intact.

Publication and promotion 
Wang wrote the book on her phone during her commute to her law offices, finishing a first draft in 2019.

Beautiful Country was published in hardcover and e-book format on September 7, 2021, by Doubleday, an imprint of Penguin Random House. An audiobook, narrated by Wang, was released the same day.

Wang promoted the book with a series of media appearances, including The Today Show interview by Jenna Bush Hager, who also selected the book as the 'impactful' memoir for September 2021. Wang also promoted the book on NPR and at the Chicago Humanities Festival.

The book debuted at number three on The New York Times nonfiction best-seller list.

Reception
Rana Foroohar of the Financial Times wrote that Beautiful Country "shows us how struggle can grind people down, making them as paranoid and cruel to each other as the system is to them." Kaitlin Jefferys of Voice magazine wrote that the memoir leaves readers with a positive message: "cling on to your dreams no matter your circumstances."

In December 2021, former President of the United States Barack Obama included Beautiful Country in his top 13 book recommendations of 2021.

References

External links
 Author's website

2021 non-fiction books
American memoirs
Literature by Chinese-American women
Doubleday (publisher) books
Debut books